The men's 200 metres event at the 2003 European Athletics U23 Championships was held in Bydgoszcz, Poland, at Zawisza Stadion on 18 and 20 July.

Medalists

Results

Final
20 July
Wind: 0.7 m/s

Heats
18 July
Qualified: first 2 in each heat and 2 best to the Final

Heat 1
Wind: 2.2 m/s

Heat 2
Wind: 0.3 m/s

Heat 3
Wind: 1.2 m/s

Participation
According to an unofficial count, 21 athletes from 17 countries participated in the event.

 (1)
 (1)
 (1)
 (1)
 (2)
 (1)
 (2)
 (1)
 (1)
 (1)
 (1)
 (1)
 (2)
 (1)
 (1)
 (1)
 (2)

References

200 metres
200 metres at the European Athletics U23 Championships